The Church of St. Barbara is a Roman Catholic parish church under the authority of the Roman Catholic Diocese of Brooklyn, located in northern Brooklyn, New York, in the Bushwick-Ridgewood neighborhood. The parish was established as a national parish to serve the German Catholic community, which later became Italian and then Hispanic by the 1960s.

Description
The church was built 1910 to the designs of the architectural firm of Helmle and Huberty. The AIA Guide to New York City wrote that the parish was "named not only for the saint but for the brewer Leonard Eppig's little daughter Barbara — Eppig contributed to the parish. Nearby St. Leonard's had a similar history of naming."

References 

 https://web.archive.org/web/20130218043234/http://bushwickbk.com/2011/04/19/bushwick-baroque-inside-st-barbaras/

Roman Catholic churches completed in 1910
Baroque Revival architecture in New York City
Spanish Baroque architecture
Roman Catholic churches in Brooklyn
National parishes
20th-century Roman Catholic church buildings in the United States